Science Museum Oklahoma is a science museum in Oklahoma City, Oklahoma. The museum is home to the Kirkpatrick Planetarium, the International Gymnastics Hall of Fame and a number of specialized galleries. The facility covers over 390,000 square feet, which makes it one of the largest science museums in the nation. It began as the Kirkpatrick Planetarium in 1958 with major additions in 1980, 1985, 2000, and 2007.

History
The Science Museum Oklahoma started as the Kirkpatrick Planetarium in 1958, which moved to a permanent home at the Oklahoma State Fairgrounds in 1962.  Later that year, the Oklahoma Science and Arts Foundation was completed on the fairgrounds.  In 1978, the foundation changed its name to Omniplex Science Museum, then moved with the Kirkpatrick Planetarium to the newly built Kirkpatrick Center museum campus.  Later additions include the Oklahoma Air and Space Museum in 1980, the Kirkpatrick Gardens and Greenhouse in 1985, and the OmniDome Theatre, Oklahoma's first large-format, dome-screen theatre, which opened in 2000. In 2007, Omniplex changed its name to Science Museum Oklahoma. Since the rebranding the museum has undergone extensive remodelling, adding numerous new exhibits and galleries, including a kid-friendly space exhibit, and art galleries.

Notable exhibits 

 Kirkpatrick Planetarium - Planetarium shows
 CurioCity - This is a Children's Museum inside the museum - a playful area which includes options like playing instruments or balancing on a tightrope
 Light Minded - A section of the museum dedicated to light and electricity
 smART Space - An exhibit which explores the interactions between science and art
 Elemental Worlds - A digital 220-degree simulated forest
 Science Floor - Main section of the museum with multiple hands-on science exhibits
 Tinkering Garage - Focuses on how engineering, art, and technology interact
 Destination Space - An exhibit which explores NASA's space program and it's connections to Oklahoma
 KidSpace - An exhibit specifically targeted to a younger audience
 Gardens - A garden made up of plants native to Oklahoma
 Aviation - An exhibit which focuses on the history of aviation
 Gadget Trees - Learning experience which focuses on simple machines

International Gymnastics Hall of Fame
The International Gymnastics Hall of Fame is located inside Science Museum Oklahoma, and features collections of medals, apparatus, awards, various pieces of sculptures, and a library.  The organization is dedicated to honoring those who have furthered the sport of gymnastics.  Inductees include Nadia Comăneci, Olga Korbut, Bart Conner, Valeri Liukin, Mary Lou Retton, Larisa Latynina, Nikolai Andrianov, and Věra Čáslavská.

See also
North American aviation halls of fame

References

External links

Science Museum Oklahoma official website
  Science Museum Oklahoma info, photos and videos on TravelOK.com Official travel and tourism website for the State of Oklahoma

Science museums in Oklahoma
Aerospace museums in Oklahoma
Native American museums in Oklahoma
Native Americans in Oklahoma City
Planetaria in the United States
Museums in Oklahoma City
Photography museums and galleries in the United States
Art museums and galleries in Oklahoma
Children's museums in Oklahoma